Men's basketball at the 2010 Asian Games was held in Guangzhou from 13 November to 26 November 2010.

Squads

Results
All times are China Standard Time (UTC+08:00)

Qualifying round

Group A

Group B

Group C

Group D

Preliminary round

Group E

Group F

Final round

Quarterfinals

Placings 5th–8th

Semifinals

Placings 7th–8th

Placings 5th–6th

Bronze medal game

Gold medal game

Final standing

References

Results

External links
Basketball results at the official website

Men